Superintendent may refer to:

Superintendent (police), Superintendent of Police (SP), or Senior Superintendent of Police (SSP), a police rank
Prison warden or Superintendent, a prison administrator
Superintendent (ecclesiastical), a church executive performing the duties of a bishop, in Lutheran and Methodist churches
Superintendent (education), an education executive or administrator
Superintendent (New Zealand), the elected head of each Provincial Council in New Zealand from 1853 to 1876
Superintendent (United States Air Force), a United States Air Force position
Superintendent (construction), a supervisor who is responsible for scheduling subcontractors on behalf of the general contractor
Building superintendent, a manager, maintenance or repair person, custodian or janitor, especially in the United States; sometimes shortened to "super"
 Soprintendenza's director (Ministry of Cultural Heritage and Activities and Tourism (Italy))
Superintendent, a character in Halo 3 ODST